The Transcaucasian Teachers Seminary in Gori (present-day Georgia) was a 4-year specialized secondary school in the Russian Empire in 1876–1917 aimed at professional training of primary school teachers. Historic building is currently used by  Gori Public School N9.

History
The Transcaucasian Teachers Seminary was founded as a specialized educational institution for the peoples of the Caucasus, who were interested in pursuing teaching careers at regional primary schools. The school was notable for having a Tatar department (Tatar was a common way of referring to Azeris and other Turkic-speaking ethnic groups of the Caucasus) established in 1879 as a result of Mirza Fatali Akhundov's efforts. The department was focusing on preparing instructors for primary schools attended only or mostly by Muslims. The language of instruction at the Transcaucasian Teachers Seminary was Russian.

After Sovietization, the seminary was reorganized into the Gori Pedagogical Institute.

Famous alumni
Uzeyir Hajibeyov
Nariman Narimanov
Vazha-Pshavela
Jalil Mammadguluzadeh
Muslim Magomayev, composer and opera conductor
Mikhail Alexeyevich Miropiev
Iakob Gogebashvili
Suleyman Sani Akhundov
Teymur Bayramalibeyov
Nurmammad bey Shahsuvarov, Minister of Education and Religious Affairs of Azerbaijan Democratic Republic in the fifth cabinet of ADR
 Farhad Aghazade
 Mirza Huseyn Hasanzade

References

Educational institutions established in 1876
Education in Georgia (country)
Buildings and structures in Gori, Georgia
Transcaucasian Teachers Seminary alumni
1876 establishments in Georgia (country)